James Winter may refer to:

 James Spearman Winter (1845–1911), Newfoundland politician and Premier
 James A. Winter (1886–1971), his son, lawyer and political figure in Newfoundland and Labrador

See also
 Jamie Winter (born 1985), Scottish football player